Squirt or squirting can refer to the following:

Animals
 Sea squirt, a marine animal

Arts and entertainment
 Squirt, a comic strip  in the Funday Times
 "Squirt" (Fluke song), a song by Fluke
 Squirt (TV series), a New Zealand children's television series
 Squirt TV, a public-access television cable TV channel
 Squirtle, a Pokémon character
 Squirt (Camp Lakebottom), a character from the animated television series  Camp Lakebottom
 Squirt, a baby sea turtle from the animated film Finding Nemo
 Squirt, a character in the animated television series Miss Spider's Sunny Patch Friends

Products
 Squirt (soft drink), a citrus-flavored soda
 Squirt (Pillow Pal), a Pillow Pal plush elephant toy made by Ty
 Squirt, a pocket knife made by Leatherman

Science, health and medicine
 Squirt, a slang term for female ejaculation
 SQuiRTs, the Screening Quick Reference Tables for pollutants, published by the US National Ocean Service's Assessment and Restoration Division

Sports and games
 Squirt (horse) (foaled 1732), a Thoroughbred racehorse, grandsire of Eclipse
 , in billiard and related games
 Squirt division, in minor ice hockey, a level of play in North America for children aged 10 and under

Other
 Squirt, slang for a person of short stature (often a child), or a small thing
 Humorous pronunciation of the sqrt (square root) function in various programming languages.
 Squirt.org, a cruising/hookup site for gay and bisexual men

See also
 
 Spray (disambiguation)
 Spurt (disambiguation)